Lady Rachel Mary Billington  (née Pakenham; born 11 May 1942) is a British author, the third daughter of the 7th Earl and Countess of Longford; both parents were writers, as was her aunt, Christine Longford.

Career
Billington worked in television in London and New York before taking up full-time writing in 1968. She has published twenty-one novels for adults, including the bestsellers A Woman's Age and Bodily Harm. Her novel Glory (2015) describes the First World War Gallipoli campaign through the eyes of the participants and their wives and girlfriends at home. She has also written six children's novels, six religious books for children and three non-fiction books, including The Great Umbilical, about mothers and daughters.

She has written plays for BBC Television's Play for Today series (Don't Be Silly and Life After Death), and several radio plays, and has contributed to film scripts including The Light at the Edge of the World (1971). Billington has also written and continues to write journalism for newspapers in both the UK and the US, including a three-year stint as columnist for The Sunday Telegraph.

Volunteer work
Billington was President of English PEN, the writers' organisation, from 1998 to 2001 and is now Honorary Vice-President. During her period as President, she initiated PEN's Readers & Writers programme, which sends books and writers to meet readers in schools, prisons and other institutions which lack resources.

She is a trustee of the Longford Trust, which was founded in memory of her father, Lord Longford. In 1991, she became a member of the editorial team of Inside Time, the not-for-profit national newspaper for prisoners. She now writes a monthly column. In addition she is a trustee of the Catholic weekly, The Tablet, and of the Siobhan Dowd Trust, set up to encourage reading among disadvantaged children.

Awards
Billington was appointed Officer of the Order of the British Empire (OBE) in the 2012 New Year Honours for her services to literature.

Personal life
Billington was married to the film, theatre and television director Kevin Billington. They had four children and five grandchildren, and lived in London and in the oldest continuously inhabited house in Dorset. She is the godmother of Boris Johnson. Her cousin is former Labour Deputy Leader Harriet Harman.

In the 2006 television film Longford, a biopic of Billington's father and his campaign for the parole of Myra Hindley, Billington was portrayed by actress Kate Miles.

Books

 Novels
 Glory
 Maria and the Admiral
 The Missing Boy
 Lies and Loyalties
 One Summer
 The Space Between
 A Woman's Life
 Tiger Sky
 Perfect Happiness
 Magic and Fate
 Bodily Harm
 Theo and Matilda
 Loving Attitudes
 The Garish Day
 Occasion of Sin
 A Woman's Age
 A Painted Devil
 Beautiful
 Cock Robin
 Lilacs Out of the Dead Land
 The Big Dipper
 All Things Nice

 Religious books
 The First Christmas
 The First Easter
 The First Miracles
 The Life of Jesus
 The Life of Saint Francis
 Chapters of Gold

 Non-fiction
 The Great Umbilical
 The Family Year

 Children's books
 Poppy's Angel
 Poppy's Hero
 There's More to Life
 Far Out!
 Star Time
 Rosanna and the Wizard-Robot

References

External links
www.rachelbillington.com
www.insidetime.org
www.longfordtrust.org

Living people
1942 births
British children's writers
20th-century British novelists
21st-century British novelists
Daughters of Irish earls
Officers of the Order of the British Empire
Rachel
Presidents of the English Centre of PEN